The 2008–09 Coupe de la Ligue began on 19 August 2008, and its final was held on 25 April 2009 at the Stade de France. The former defending champions, Paris Saint-Germain, were initially barred from participating in the cup after a group of PSG supporters unfurled an offensive banner during last year's final. After PSG appealed the ban, however, the Tribunal Administratif de Paris judge vacated the ruling allowing PSG to defend their Coupe de la Ligue title. Due to this, a new draw was announced. French Football Federation (FFF) president Jean-Pierre Escalettes vowed to get the second ruling overturned, stating, "I won't give up," and, "I can't allow acts like this to go unpunished," but was unsuccessful. The winners of the Coupe de la Ligue qualified for the third qualifying round of the 2009–10 UEFA Europa League.

Ligue 1 club Bordeaux won the competition by defeating Ligue 2 club Vannes by a score of 4–0 in the final.

Calendar
On 16 July, the Ligue de Football Professionnel announced the calendar for the Coupe de la Ligue.

Note: Due to Paris Saint-Germain's re-entry into the tournament, the draw was redone with different dates attached to the matches.

First round
The matches were played on 3 September 2008.

|}

Second round
The matches were played on 9 September 2008.

|}

Third round
The matches were played on 23 September 2008.

|}

The matches were played on 24 September 2008.

|}

Final Draw

Right Side Bracket

Left side bracket

Final draw results

Round of 16

Quarter-finals

Semi-finals

Final

Topscorer
Madjid Bouabdellah (3 goals)

See also
 2008–09 Ligue 1
 2008–09 Ligue 2
 2008–09 Championnat National

External links
 Coupe de la Ligue official websites:
 English
 French

References

Coupe de la Ligue seasons
France
League Cup